Agueda Martinez: Our People, Our Country is a 1977 American short documentary film about weaver Agueda Salazar Martinez, produced by Moctesuma Esparza. It was nominated for an Academy Award for Best Documentary Short.

References

External links

1977 films
1977 documentary films
1977 short films
1977 independent films
1970s short documentary films
American independent films
American short documentary films
1970s English-language films
1970s American films